The Microsoft Macro Assembler (MASM) is an x86 assembler that uses the Intel syntax for MS-DOS and Microsoft Windows. Beginning with MASM 8.0, there are two versions of the assembler: One for 16-bit & 32-bit assembly sources, and another (ML64) for 64-bit sources only.

MASM is maintained by Microsoft, but since version 6.12 it has not been sold as a separate product. It is instead supplied with various Microsoft SDKs and C compilers. Recent versions of MASM are included with Microsoft Visual Studio.

Notable applications written in MASM are RollerCoaster Tycoon which was 99% written in MASM.

History
The earliest versions of MASM date back to 1981. They were sold either as the generic "Microsoft Macro Assembler" for all x86 machines or as the OEM version specifically for IBM PCs. By Version 4.0, the IBM release was dropped. Up to Version 3.0, MASM was also bundled with a smaller companion assembler, ASM.EXE. This was intended for PCs with only 64k of memory and lacked some features of the full MASM, such as the ability to use code macros.

MS-DOS versions up to 4.x included Microsoft's LINK utility, which was designed to convert intermediate OBJ files generated by MASM and other compilers; however, as users who did not program had no use of the utility, it was moved to their compiler packages.

Version 4.0 added support for 286 instructions and also shorthand mnemonics for segment descriptors (.code, .data, etc.). Version 5.0 supported 386 instructions, but it could still only generate real mode executables.

Through version 5.0, MASM was available as an MS-DOS application only. Versions 5.1 and 6.0 were available as both MS-DOS and OS/2 applications.

Version 6.0, released in 1992, added parameter passing with "invoke" and some other high level-like constructs, in addition to the already existing high level-like records, among other things. By the end of the year, version 6.1A updated the memory management to be compatible with code produced by Visual C++. In 1993 full support for protected mode 32-bit applications and the Pentium instruction set was added. The MASM binary at that time was shipped as a "bi-modal" DOS-extended binary (using the Phar Lap TNT DOS extender).

Versions 6.12 to 6.14 were implemented as patches for version 6.11. These patches changed the type of the binary to native PE format. Version 6.11 is the last version of MASM that will run under MS-DOS.

By the end of 1997, MASM fully supported Windows 95 and included some AMD-specific instructions.

In 1999, Intel released macros for SIMD and MMX instructions, which were shortly thereafter supported natively by MASM. With the 6.15 release in 2000, Microsoft discontinued support for MASM as a separate product, instead subsuming it into the Visual Studio toolset. Though it was still compatible with Windows 98, current versions of Visual Studio were not. Support for 64-bit processors was not added until the release of Visual Studio 2005, with MASM 8.0.

After 25 June 2015, there are at least three different MASMs with the version number 14.00.23026. In Microsoft Visual Studio 2015 Enterprise Edition, there is one "amd64_x86" ml and two ml64s, "x86_amd64" and "amd64". They run on different platforms targeting different platforms:
 amd64_x86: generates 64-bit code, runs in a Windows 32-bit environment
 x86_amd64: generates 32-bit code, runs in a Windows 64-bit environment
 amd64:     generates 64-bit code, runs in a Windows 64-bit environment

Object module formats supported by MASM
Early versions of MASM generated object modules using the OMF format, which was used to create binaries for MS-DOS or OS/2.

Since version 6.1, MASM is able to produce object modules in the Portable Executable (PE/COFF) format. PE/COFF is compatible with recent Microsoft C compilers, and object modules produced by either MASM or the C compiler can be routinely intermixed and linked into Win32 and Win64 binaries.

Assemblers compatible with MASM 
Some other assemblers can assemble most code written for MASM, with the exception of more complex macros.

 Turbo Assembler (TASM) developed by Borland, later owned by Embarcadero, last updated in 2002, but still supplied with C++Builder and RAD Studio.
 JWasm Macro Assembler, licensed under the Sybase Open Watcom EULA. Last updated in 2014.
 Pelle's Macro Assembler, a component of the Pelles C  development environment.
 UASM is a free MASM-compatible assembler based on JWasm.
 ASMC is a free MASM-compatible assembler based on JWasm.

Mixed language programming support
Documentation for 1987's version 5.1 included support for "Microsoft BASIC, C, FORTRAN, Pascal."

See also
 Microsoft MACRO-80
 Assembly language
 High-level assembler
 Comparison of assemblers

References

External links
 
 Intro to MASM Win32
 Masm32 project

1981 software
Assemblers
Microsoft development tools
DOS software
Programming tools for Windows